The Oued Mebtouh is a river and the name of a town in the Département d'Oran, Algeria. The river is a tributary of the Macta River.

References

Rivers of Algeria